HMS Mermaid was a Modified Black Swan-class sloop of the Royal Navy. Mermaid saw service as a convoy escort during the Second World War, taking part in the sinking of two German submarines while escorting Arctic convoys to and from the Soviet Union.

Mermaid was sold to Federal Republic of Germany in 1959, where she was renamed Scharnhorst and used as a training ship.

Construction
Mermaid, built by William Denny and Brothers, Dumbarton, Scotland, was laid down on 8 September 1942, launched on 11 November 1943, and completed 12 May 1944.

As with all the modified Black Swans, Mermaids main gun armament was six QF 4 inch Mk XVI anti-aircraft guns in three dual turrets. When completed, this was supplemented by a close-in anti-aircraft outfit of ten Oerlikon 20 mm cannon in three dual and two single mounts, although two twin 40 Bofors guns (in two twin mounts) replaced four of the 20 mm guns. Anti-submarine armament consisted of 110 depth charges and a Hedgehog anti-submarine spigot mortar.

Royal Navy service
Mermaids first operations were as part of the escort for the Arctic convoy JW 59 to Murmansk in August 1944, with it being credited with a part of sinking the U-boat  on 24 August in conjunction with the destroyer , the sloop  and the frigate .

In 1945 Mermaid was assigned to the British Pacific Fleet. However arriving at Aden en route she learned of the Japanese surrender, and of her recall for service with the Mediterranean Fleet as part of the 33rd Escort Flotilla. She received the new pennant number 'F30' and was based in Malta, as part of the 3rd Frigate Flotilla. This Flotilla took part in patrols preventing illegal immigrants following the formation of Israel. She returned to Portsmouth in 1954 where was placed in reserve.

She remained in the Mediterranean up to 1954 when she returned to Britain to be placed in reserve status at Portsmouth. In 1953 she took part in the Fleet Review to celebrate the Coronation of Queen Elizabeth II.

West German Navy service
In 1957, West Germany purchased seven escorts, including Mermaid for its newly established Bundesmarine. After refit, Mermaid was handed over to the Bundesmarine on 28 May 1959, and was renamed Scharnhorst.  Scharnhorst was used as a gunnery training vessel by the Germans, and was refitted with a more modern gun armament and sensors from June 1961 to July 1962, with two automatic French 100 mm naval guns replacing six manually loaded 4 inch guns, with a short range armament of four Bofors L/70 40 mm guns replacing two 40 mm guns. Scharnhorst was removed from the active list in 1980, and was used for damage control training until broken up in 1990.

References

Publications

External links
  Mermaid at naval-history.net
 Mermaid at U-boat.net
 Mermaid - Life on Board by John Murray

 

Black Swan-class sloops
Ships built on the River Clyde
1943 ships